The Spirit of St. Louis was a named passenger train on the Pennsylvania Railroad and its successors Penn Central and Amtrak between New York and St. Louis, Missouri. The Pennsylvania introduced the Spirit of St. Louis on June 15, 1927, replacing the New Yorker (eastbound) and St. Louisian (westbound); that September its schedule was 24 hr 50 min each way.

The name honored the airplane Spirit of St. Louis, flown the month before by Charles Lindbergh from New York to Paris. The Spirit of St. Louis remained in service through the inception of Amtrak, who extended it to Kansas City, Missouri along the Missouri Pacific Railroad main line. The train had a competitor in the New York Central Railroad's Southwestern Limited, also running from New York to St. Louis.

Amtrak also added a branch from Harrisburg, Pennsylvania to Washington, D.C., via York, Pennsylvania and Baltimore, Maryland.  In July 1971, to better reflect its new scope, the train was rebranded as the National Limited–the name of a longstanding train that had been operated by the Baltimore & Ohio Railroad and had been the principal rival of the Spirit of St. Louis.

References

Further reading

External links 
 

Named passenger trains of the United States
Night trains of the United States
Former Amtrak routes
Passenger rail transportation in Pennsylvania
Passenger rail transportation in New York (state)
Passenger rail transportation in New Jersey
Passenger rail transportation in Ohio
Passenger rail transportation in Indiana
Passenger rail transportation in Missouri
Railway services introduced in 1927
Railway services discontinued in 1971
Former long distance Amtrak routes